Fulvia, the wife of Tiberius' 'amicus' Saturninus, lived during the reign of the Roman Emperor Tiberius. (She is sometimes confused with Fulvia the wife of Marcus Antonius who died before the Principate began.) 

Fulvia converted to Judaism through the teachings of a Jew who had sought refuge in Rome to escape persecution. This impostor, together with three others, persuaded her to contribute purple and gold for the Temple at Jerusalem, which contributions they kept for themselves. The discovery of this fraud by the emperor Tiberius through his friend Saturninus, Fulvia's husband, caused the deportation of the Jews from Rome to Sardinia. (19 C.E.; Josephus, "Ant." xviii. 3, § 5; comp. Philo, "In Flaccum," § 1; idem, "Legatio ad Caium," § 24; Tacitus, "Annales," ii. 85; Suetonius, "Tiberius," § 36).

References 
 

1st-century Romans
Fulvii
1st-century Roman women
Converts to Judaism from paganism
Year of birth unknown
Year of death unknown